Shelburne may refer to:

People
 Marquess of Lansdowne
 John Petty, 1st Earl of Shelburne (1706–1761), Member of the Great Britain Parliament
 William Petty, 2nd Earl of Shelburne (1737–1805), Prime Minister of Great Britain
 Ramona Shelburne (born 1979), American sportswriter and softball player

Places

Australia 
 Shelburne, Queensland, a locality in the Shire of Cook

Canada 
 Shelburne, Nova Scotia
 Shelburne, Nova Scotia (municipal district)
 Shelburne County, Nova Scotia
 Shelburne (federal electoral district), Nova Scotia
 Shelburne (provincial electoral district), Nova Scotia
 Shelburne, Ontario

Ireland 
 Shelburne (barony), a barony in County Wexford

United States 
 Shelburne, Indiana
 Shelburne, Massachusetts
 Shelburne, New Hampshire
 Shelburne, Vermont, a New England town
 Shelburne (CDP), Vermont, the central village in the town
 Shelburne Museum

Ship
 HMS Shelburne (1813)

See also
Shelbourne (disambiguation)